A patrol hat, also known as a field cap, is a soft kepi constructed similarly to a baseball cap, with a stiff, rounded visor but featuring a flat top, worn by military personnel of some countries in the field when a combat helmet is not required.

History

U.S. Military

M1951 Field Cap and Ridgeway Cap

The M1951 Field Cap, introduced with the M1951 Uniform, was a derivative of the M1943 Field Cap, part of the M1943 Uniform. The M1951 cap was worn in the Korean War, where it became known as the "patrol cap" by the US Army Rangers there. It was constructed of wind-resistant olive drab cotton poplin, and had a flannel wool panel that folded down to cover the ears and the back of the head. It was soft enough to be worn underneath an M-1 helmet. After the Korean War, the cap was replaced by the Ridgeway Cap, a stiffened version of the M1951 made by Falcon and known as the Jump Up cap. The hat became famous outside America after being worn by Fidel Castro. The patrol cap was replaced altogether in 1962 with a baseball-like "Cap, Field (Hot Weather)" and during the Vietnam War by the boonie hat.

In 1980 the Army introduced the Battle Dress Uniform (BDU) which featured a patrol cap similar to the M1951 Field Cap, including the wool panel to cover the ears, except it was in Woodland camouflage. The BDU was replaced, starting in 2004, with the Army Combat Uniform (ACU).

Starting on June 14, 2001, Army Chief of Staff General Eric Shinseki made the black beret the standard headgear for Soldiers in the garrison environment. On June 14, 2011, the M1951/ACU soft patrol cap became once again the primary headgear for all Soldiers as the duty uniform headgear after a 10-year hiatus in favor of the beret, according to Army Directive 2011-11.

Modern patrol caps
In 1981, following the introduction of the M81 Battle Dress Uniform, the patrol cap was reintroduced. The patrol cap continues to be worn with the Army Combat Uniform, introduced in 2004. The materials are 50% cotton, 50% nylon blend. It has been available in different variants and patterns, such as hot weather models which have eliminated the ear flaps.

Patterns have included US Woodland, Six color desert camouflage, Three color desert camouflage, Universal Camouflage Pattern, and Operational Camouflage Pattern. The ACU patrol cap features a velcro-backed patch on the back with the soldier's name printed on it and a small internal pocket, the soldier's rank insignia is pinned on the front, as seen in the image below.

Israel Defense Forces
This style of military uniform cap was worn by the Muleteers' Battalion founded in January 1948 which was named for the British Army's Zion Mule Corps of the World War I, a forerunner of the Jewish Legion. The IDF adopted the "Kova Hitelmacher" [: hatmaker's cap] for soldiers' uniforms in its early years.

See also

Utility cover, the U.S. Navy and Marine Corps equivalent
Side cap
Jeep cap

References

2000s fashion
United States military uniforms
Caps
Military equipment of the United States
United States Army uniforms
United States Air Force uniforms
Military hats